This is a list of the recipients of the Today's Top 10 Award given each year by the National Collegiate Athletic Association (NCAA) since its inception in 1973.  The names of these exceptional individuals are engraved in the Hall of Honor at the NCAA Hall of Champions on the NCAA Headquarters in Indianapolis, Indiana. Recognition in the NCAA Hall of Honor ensures these athletes are remembered. They have reached the pinnacle of national athletic and academic success through their accomplishments. As of 2020, there are more than 480,000 NCAA student-athletes annually. This award recognizes the nation's best former student-athletes from every NCAA sport and division. Each year, the recipients are honored at the NCAA Convention.

Note that the award was previously known as the Today's Top V Award (1973 through 1985), Today's Top VI Award (1986 through 1994), and Today's Top VIII Award (1995 through 2013).

Today's Top 10 Award (2014–present)

2021 Recipients

2020 Recipients

2019 Recipients

2018 Recipients

2017 Recipients

2016 Recipients

2015 Recipients

2014 Recipients

Today's Top VIII Award (1995–2013)

Today's Top VI Award (1986–1994)

Today's Top V Award (1973–1985)

References

https://www.ncaa.org/sites/default/files/Top10Award.pdf

College sports trophies and awards in the United States
Student athlete awards in the United States
Today's Top 10 Award list